London Elise Moore Kress (born November 2, 1992) is an American actress and stunt performer. She appeared in the movie Into the Storm (2014) with her future then-to-be husband Nathan Kress. She acted in The Other Woman (2014), Need for Speed (2014), Insidious: Chapter 3 (2015) and the TV series Rake (2014). She has done stunt double work as well for the movies Insidious Chapter 3, Grandma, Into the Storm, and Oz the Great and Powerful.

Personal life 
Moore married actor Nathan Kress on November 15, 2015. They have two daughters: Rosie Carolyn and Evie Elise.

References

External links 
 

1992 births
Living people
21st-century American actresses
American film actresses